Taylor is an unincorporated community in Beckham County, Oklahoma. It was named after its first postmaster, Jeremiah H. Taylor. The post office operated from July 26, 1895, to May 4, 1899.

References

Unincorporated communities in Oklahoma
Unincorporated communities in Beckham County, Oklahoma